Daina Reid (born 1966) is an Australian director and actress who has been acting since the early 1990s. She began directing in 1999.

Education and career
Reid graduated from the Western Australian Academy of Performing Arts acting course in 1990. She is known for Full Frontal from 1995 to 1997.
Her directing credits include Sunshine for Australian broadcaster, SBS (Special Broadcasting Service), The Secret River, INXS: Never Tear Us Apart, Paper Giants: The Birth of Cleo and Howzat! Kerry Packer's War. She has also directed episodes of Miss Fisher's Murder Mysteries, Offspring, The Handmaids Tale, The Outsider, Space Force and Young Rock.

Daina Reid was nominated for a 2019 Emmy Award for Outstanding Directing for a Drama Series for her work on The Handmaids Tale.

In 2017, Daina Reid was the recipient of the Michael Carson Award "for excellence in the craft of television drama direction" at the Australian Directors' Guild (ADG) Awards.

In 2020, Daina Reid was announced as director of Hannah Kent’s psychological thriller Run Rabbit Run'', starring Sarah Snook, Damon Herriman and Greta Scacchi.

References

External links
 
 

Australian women comedians
Australian television personalities
Women television personalities
Australian television directors
Australian screenwriters
Living people
Date of birth missing (living people)
1964 births
Australian women television directors
Western Australian Academy of Performing Arts alumni